Chapa is a surname. Notable people with the surname include:

 Damian Chapa (born 1963), American actor
 Erick Chapa (21st century), Mexican actor
 María Ceseñas Chapa (born 1952), Mexican politician
 Miguel Ángel Granados Chapa (1941–2011), Mexican journalist
 Rudy Chapa (born 1957), American businessperson
 Tatiana Palacios Chapa (born 1968), Mexican American singer

See also

Chara (given name)